Gunnar Henningsson, (15 April 1895 - 21 October 1960) was a Swedish poet, idealist and teacher.
Gunnar Henningsson has published the collections of poems "En ungkarl på landet", "Ragnarök" and "Dikter 1928-1950" and also the prose stories "Grävlingarna och hans grannar" and "Harstigar och svampmarker". He was also a contributor in Scandinavian papers and in American and Swedish-American papers and also in educational journals and magazines.

Works published by Gunnar Henningsson
 En ungkarl på landet (1928)
 Ragnarök (1935)
 Grävlingen och hans grannar  (1938)
 Harstigar och svampmarker (1942)
 Dikter 1928-1950  (1951)

References
 Sagerdal, Åke (1960), Katrineholmskuriren

Swedish male poets
1895 births
1960 deaths
20th-century Swedish poets
20th-century Swedish male writers